Kirk Raymond Shimmins (born 1 June 1994) is an Irish field hockey player who plays as a midfielder for Belgian club KHC Dragons and the Irish national team.

He competed for the Ireland men's national field hockey team at the 2016 Summer Olympics. He played at the youth levels of Pembroke Wanderers and has played club hockey in Ireland until 2018 when he transferred to KHC Dragons in the Men's Belgian Hockey League.

References

External links
 
 Kirk Shimmins at Hockey Ireland
 
 
 

1994 births
Living people
Irish male field hockey players
Male field hockey midfielders
Olympic field hockey players of Ireland
Field hockey players at the 2016 Summer Olympics
2018 Men's Hockey World Cup players
KHC Dragons players
Pembroke Wanderers Hockey Club players
Irish expatriate sportspeople in Belgium
Ireland international men's field hockey players
People educated at Wesley College, Dublin
Men's Belgian Hockey League players
Men's Irish Hockey League players